The Kia Opirus is an executive car/full-size sedan, manufactured by Kia Motors and marketed over a single generation for model years 2003–2012 globally and 2004-2009 in North America. Having debuted internationally at the 2003 Geneva Motor Show, the four-door, five-passenger, front-engine, front-drive sedan was launched to the North American market at the New York International Auto Show and in San Diego, bearing the Amanti nameplate — and prioritizing luxury content and comfort over dynamic performance and agility.

Intended to give Kia upward access to global premium markets, the Opirus represented a departure for the brand in both styling and market positioning. Developed over 22 months at a cost US$167 million (€143 million), 18% of the overall development cost went to R&D investment and 41% to development of production technologies. 

As Kia's first premium vehicle, the Opirus replaced the Mazda 929-derived Enterprise in the South Korean domestic market. The Opirus was also the first Kia vehicle sharing a platform with sister company Hyundai, using a variation of the third generation Hyundai Grandeur/XG Y4 platform. For the Oprius, the platform was lengthened 1.9 inches, overall length increased 4.1 inches and height increased 2.6 inches. As Kia's largest sedan, the Opirus was marketed in a single trim level, sharing components with the Grandeur/XG, and a range of engines including its 3.5 L V6 engine (North America). All models were manufactured in Kia's Hwaseong Plant near Incheon. 

A 2007 facelift, introduced at the 2006 Paris Auto Show, included upgraded specifications, a curb weight reduction of 250 pounds, revised suspension and a 3.8 L V6 engine (North America) with a 32-percent increase in power over its predecessor. Styling revisions included a shorter and wider grill, revised hood, headlamps, front and rear bumper fascias, alloy wheels, trunk deck lid, tail lamps, dual exhaust outlets and rear quarter panels. The interior featured a revised instrument panel design. 

The name Opirus referred to the ancient city of Ophir, noted for its wealth — and was selected via an online survey from the choices of Opirus, Regent and Conzern. In 2004, the New York Times described the name Amanti as an untranslatable latinate construction, intended to connote luxury.

Design and equipment
The Opirus' styling — described variously as conservative, neo-classic, restrained, unoriginal and derivative — drew cues from disparate sources, notably the Mercedes-Benz E-class, Lincoln Town Car, Jaguar S-Type, Lexus GS, Chrysler 300C, and Lancia Thesis. 

In the Korean Domestic Market, interior features included available heated and reclining rear seats, high-intensity-discharge headlights, navigation system, electro-luminescent gauges, ignition immobilizer, reverse parking sensors and electronically  adjustable suspension settings. 

In North America, the sedan was marketed to value-sensitive 40-to-60-year-old professionals with standard equipment at introduction including manually tilting leather-wrapped, four-spoke steering wheel with faux woodgrain inserts and remote audio and cruise controls; faux wood grain dash, console and door accents (lighter prior to the 2007 facelift, darker thereafter); power locks and windows; CD player with six speakers; electronic driver- and passenger-adjustable climate control; front, curtain and side airbags; dual zone automatic climate control; keyless entry; herring bone cloth interior; glove-box only key; elongated LED turn-signals; rain-sensing windshield wipers; analog clock; foot-operated parking brake (releasable by a dash-mounted pull-handle); power moonroof; 16" alloy wheels; full-size spare on an alloy wheel; and an eight-way powered driver's bucket seat and four-way passenger bucket seat with door-mounted adjustment controls using a "mock-seat" ergonomic design.  The interior received heavy acoustic insulation, and later models included heated rear seats, and electro-luminescent instrument lighting. European models include two ISOFIX anchorage points.

Options included leather interior, 270-watt Infinity stereo with subwoofer and six-disc changer, dashboard LCD screen, trip computer with 4" LCD screen, heated seats, Adjustable pedals, auto-dimming rearview mirror, and pearl coat paint. Safety equipment included eight airbags, and obstruction-sensing, anti-pinch power windows.

The Opirus offered a passenger volume of 105.6 cubic feet and a 15.5 cubic foot cargo volume — the trunk equipped with a gas strut-assisted lid and luggage restraining net.

In North America, J.D. Power and Associates recognized the Amanti as the "Most Appealing Premium Midsize Car" in its 2005 Automotive Performance, Execution and Layout Study.

Drivetrain 
The Opirus was marketed globally with the 3.5L Sigma and the 3.8L Lambda engines. The North American Amanti featured the 3.5 liter engine producing 200 bhp at 5500 rpm and 220 lb.-ft. of torque at 3500 rpm. Shifting was by a 5-speed automatic transmission, shifting either in fully automatic or manual sequential modes — the latter controlled via an "H"-shaped shift gate. Steering was an electronically power assisted rack and pinion system with an overall ratio of 15.24:1 and a turning radius of 5.7 meters.

Suspension featured coil springs, anti-roll bars (26 mm front, 16 mm rear), gas-pressurized shocks, a front independent, double A-arm (wishbone) design with unequal-length control arms and rear multi-link rear geometry. Suspension included an ECS (electronically controlled suspension) system with automatic and sport mode, selectable via a switch adjacent to the transmission shift gate and the sport mode providing stiffer shock absorber settings.

Brakes included 11.9/11.2-inch front/rear discs with four channel, four sensors ABS (anti-lock brakes), BAS (emergency brake assist), EBD (electronic brake force distribution), TCS (traction control system), and ESP (electronic stability program). 

The Opirus is the first Kia to integrate an Electronic Stability Program (ESP), developed with Continental Teves of Germany.

Engines

References

External links 

 Kia Opirus official site
 Cars.com review
 ConsumerGuide review
 Kia Amanti Research Guide

Opirus
Executive cars
Full-size vehicles
Flagship vehicles
Sedans
Front-wheel-drive vehicles
Cars introduced in 2003
Limousines